The Attorney General of the Republic is the head of the Attorney General's Office (prior to 2019) and the Federal Public Ministry of the United Mexican States, an institution belonging to the Federal Government's constitutional autonomous organism that is responsible for the investigation and prosecution of federal crimes. 
The office is governed mainly by article 102 of the 1917 Constitution and the Organic Law of the Attorney General's Office.

Organization

The 's Office is organized into several subordinate entities, including eight Specialized Prosecutor Offices (Competition Control, Regional Control, Organized Crime, Election-related Crimes, Corruption, Human Rights, Crimes of Violence against Women and Human Trafficking, and Internal Affairs), Criminal Investigation Agency(Federal Ministerial Police, General Coordination of Expert Services (CGSP) and the National Center for Planning, Analysis and Information for Combating Crime (CENAPI)), Specialized Body for Alternative Dispute Resolution Mechanisms, Administrative office and Internal control organ.

List of attorneys general

21st century
Alejandro Gertz Manero (1 December 2018 – present)
Alberto Elías Beltrán (16 October 2017 – 30 November 2018)
Raúl Cervantes Andrade (26 October 2016 – 16 October 2017)
Arely Gómez González (27 February 2015 – 26 October 2016)
Jesús Murillo Karam (4 December 2012 – 27 February 2015)
Marisela Morales (1 April 2011 – 4 December 2012)
Arturo Chávez (24 September 2009 – 31 March 2011)
Eduardo Medina Mora (1 December 2006 – 7 September 2009)
Daniel Cabeza de Vaca (28 April 2005 – 30 November 2006)
Rafael Macedo de la Concha (1 December 2000 – 27 April 2005)

20th century

See also

Justice ministry
Law enforcement in Mexico

References

External links
 Attorney General's Office website

Cabinet of Mexico
Law enforcement in Mexico
Federal law enforcement agencies of Mexico
Prosecution
 
Justice ministries
Lists of government ministers of Mexico